The Annual Review of Genomics and Human Genetics is a peer-reviewed scientific journal published by Annual Reviews since 2000. It releases an annual volume of review articles relevant to the fields of genomics and human genetics. Aravinda Chakravarti and Eric D. Green have been the journal's co-editors since 2005. As of 2022, it has a 2021 impact factor of 9.340.

History
The Annual Review of Genomics and Human Genetics was first published in 2000. The nonprofit publisher Annual Reviews decided that its existing journals of the Annual Review of Medicine and Annual Review of Genetics were shifting their coverage from biochemical genetics to molecular interpretation; the new journal could focus on the intersection of genetics and medicine. Another impetus for forming the journal was the then-ongoing Human Genome Project to map the human genome. The founding editor was Eric Lander, who stayed in the role through 2004. Though it was initially in publication with a print volume, it is now only published electronically.

Scope and indexing
The Annual Review of Genomics and Human Genetics defines its scope as covering significant developments in the field of genomics that are relevant to human genetics and the human genome. Included subfields are human genetic disorders, individualized medicine, human genetic variation, the structure and function of genomes, genetic engineering, and human evolution. As of 2022, Journal Citation Reports lists the journal's impact factor as 9.340, ranking it twelfth of 175 journal titles in the category "Genetics & Heredity". It is abstracted and indexed in Scopus, Science Citation Index Expanded, MEDLINE, EMBASE, Chemical Abstracts Core, and Academic Search, among others.

Editorial processes
The Annual Review of Genomics and Human Genetics is helmed by the editor or the co-editors. The editor is assisted by the editorial committee, which includes associate editors, regular members, and occasionally guest editors. Guest members participate at the invitation of the editor, and serve terms of one year. All other members of the editorial committee are appointed by the Annual Reviews board of directors and serve five-year terms. The editorial committee determines which topics should be included in each volume and solicits reviews from qualified authors. Unsolicited manuscripts are not accepted. Peer review of accepted manuscripts is undertaken by the editorial committee.

Current editorial board
As of 2022, the editorial committee consists of the co-editors and the following members:

 Wendy A. Bickmore
 Robert Cook-Deegan
 Nancy J. Cox
 Thomas Gingeras
 Pui-Yan Kwok
 Julie Makani
 Arnold Munnich
 Mai Har Sham
 Sarah A. Teichmann

References

 

Genomics and Human Genetics
Annual journals
Publications established in 2000
English-language journals
Genomics journals
Medical genetics journals